Lindy Lumsden  (born 1955) is a principal research scientist with the Department of Environment, Land, Water and Planning, at the Arthur Rylah Institute for Environmental Research, in Melbourne, Australia.

Early life and education
Born in Foster, Victoria, in 1955, Lindy completed a Bachelor of Science, with a major in Zoology, at the University of Melbourne in 1975. She received her PhD from Deakin University in 2004, with her thesis on 'The ecology and conservation of insectivorous bats in rural landscapes'.

Career
Lumsden began her career in 1979, working as a technical officer surveying the vertebrate fauna of the Western Port catchment, with the Museum of Victoria.  She has worked at the Arthur Rylah Institute (ARI) since 1982. Her first roles were with the Wildlife Survey Team, conducting mammal surveys throughout Victoria to inform land-use planning decisions by the Land Conservation Council, including the Melbourne-2 area.  From 1991-1994 Lindy undertook a major project on the conservation of insectivorous bats in remnant vegetation in rural environments in northern Victoria. From 1995 to 2000 she was part of an extensive collaborative project in the Box-Ironbark region of Victoria investigating extinction processes affecting vertebrate fauna.  At this time Lindy also undertook consultancies on bats within Victoria and throughout Australia, including on Christmas Island. As part of this, Lindy prepared the Christmas Island Pipistrelle Recovery Plan.

From 2004 to 2008, Lumsden was program leader of the Threatened Fauna Species Program at ARI, managing several staff and targeted research projects, working on many collaborative projects. Since November 2008, Lumsden has been the principal research scientist and Section Leader of the Wildlife Ecology Section at ARI, managing a team of scientists and technical staff, and responsible for many projects. She led the key government priority project 'A New Strategic Approach to Biodiversity Management', developing an effective landscape approach to the management of threatened species that provides opportunities for sustainable timber production while managing biodiversity at a landscape scale.  This work resulted in innovative developments in survey methods for cryptic forest fauna.

Lumsden's research projects have included investigating the conservation requirements of bats in agricultural landscapes in Victoria.  Overall, Lindy has published 34 journal articles, 39 book sections; 27 popular articles and notes; and more than 28 unpublished reports.

Lumsden is passionate about changing people's attitudes to bats, which are a poorly understood group of native fauna. She delivers large numbers of presentations to community groups and university students, and runs courses and field days on the conservation of bats (over the last 20 years she has averaged 25 presentations per year).  She has undertaken many radio interviews on ABC radio throughout Australia and internationally (Radio Australia) and her work has been reported in Melbourne and rural newspapers.

Awards
 2014	The Northern free-tailed bat—Ozimops lumsdenae—was named after Lumsden.  The naming recognises Lindy's contribution to the study of Australian bat ecology, for her mentoring of students and her advocacy for conservation of bats through public engagement. The description of this species follows recognition that the Australian populations of this bat are distinct from those in south-east Asia.
 2012	Honorary Life Member of the Australasian Bat Society. 
 2005	David Ashton Biodiversity and Ecosystems Award, Department of Sustainability and Environment.  
 2003	Loch Postgraduate Research Award, School of Ecology and Environment, Deakin University. 
 2001-2004 Bill Emison PhD Scholarship.

Scientific expeditions
Lindy has contributed to 16 scientific expeditions overseas or in remote areas of Australia, to investigate the ecology and conservation of the bat fauna in these region. This has included helping to train bat ecologists in other countries in new research techniques and approaches (e.g. in Taiwan and Swaziland). 
 1988	Survey of bats and small mammals in the Kimberley region of Western Australia.
 1990	Australian Museum expedition to Vanuatu to survey vertebrate fauna, specifically bats.
 1993	Royal Geographic Society of Queensland expedition to Cape York Peninsula – study of the bats during the wet season with Dr Roger Coles.
 1991 and 1995 Assisted Dr Ken Geluso with research on the bat and small mammal fauna of Carlsbad Caverns National Park, New Mexico, USA.
 1994	Investigation of the status and habitat requirements of the Christmas Island Pipistrelle (Pipistrellus murrayi) on Christmas Island, Indian Ocean.
 1996	Study of short-tailed bat (Mystacina tuberculata) on Codfish Island, New Zealand, with the Department of Conservation, investigating the feasibility, and impact, of taking large numbers of bats into captivity on the island while rat poison baiting occurred.
 1996	La Trobe University Expedition to Krakatau, Indonesia, investigating the recolonisation of the volcanic islands by bats.
 1998	Study of the ecology and conservation status of the Christmas Island Pipistrelle (Pipistrellus murrayi) on Christmas Island, Indian Ocean.
 1998	Research on the effects of fragmentation on bats and birds in Brazil.
 1999	Survey of bats in the Kununurra region of the Kimberley, WA.
 2000	Study of foraging behaviour of Greater Horseshoe Bats (Rhinolophus ferrumequinum) in England.
 2004	Survey of bats in Taiwan.
 2004 	Survey of bats in the Kununurra region of the Kimberley, WA/NT for WA Dept. Industry and Resources.
 2005	Research on bats in Swaziland.
 2005	Investigations of threats to survival of the pipistrelle (Pipistrellus murrayi) on Christmas Island, Indian Ocean for Department of Environment and Heritage and Parks Australia North.
 2009	Rescue attempt to avert the extinction of Pipistrellus murrayi on Christmas Island

References

External links
 Arthur Rylah Institute for Environmental Research

Australian zoologists
Australian women scientists
University of Melbourne alumni
Deakin University alumni
Living people
1955 births
People from Foster, Victoria